Motörhead Live: Everything Löuder than Everything Else is a 1991 live video featuring Motörhead's performance recorded at the Deutsches Museum in Munich, Germany on 11 March 1991. Most of the material was recorded in grainy b/w, as was popular at the time. However, some scenes were recorded in colour, or have some colour in them.

The initial UK release has a sticker on the front, inviting fans to send off for a free poster.

Track listing

Credits
 Lemmy – bass guitar, vocals
 Phil "Wizzo" Campbell – guitar
 Michael "Würzel" Burston – guitar
 Phil "Philthy Animal" Taylor – drums

References

Motörhead video albums
1991 video albums
Live video albums
1991 live albums
Motörhead live albums
Sony Music live albums
Sony Music video albums